Niko Opper (born February 4, 1992) is a German footballer who currently plays for SC Hessen Dreieich.

External links

1992 births
Living people
German footballers
Germany youth international footballers
Bayer 04 Leverkusen II players
SV Babelsberg 03 players
Alemannia Aachen players
3. Liga players
Association football fullbacks
SC Hessen Dreieich players

Hessenliga players
Footballers from Berlin